Columbia City is the name of several places in the United States:

Columbia City, Indiana
Columbia City, Oregon
Columbia City, Seattle, a neighborhood of Seattle

See also
Columbia (disambiguation)
Columbia, Missouri
Columbia, South Carolina